The 2013–14 Notre Dame Fighting Irish women's basketball team represented University of Notre Dame during the 2013–14 NCAA Division I women's basketball season. The Fighting Irish, led by twenty-seventh year head coach Muffet McGraw, played their home games at the Purcell Pavilion at the Joyce Center and were 1st year members of the Atlantic Coast Conference. They finished the season with 37–1 overall, 16–0 in ACC play to win both of the ACC Regular Season and Tournament. They earned an automatic bid to the 2014 NCAA Division I women's basketball tournament where they defeated Robert Morris in the first round, Arizona State in the second round, Oklahoma State in the Sweet Sixteen, and Baylor in the Elite Eight to make it to their sixth Final Four, where they defeated Maryland. In the championship game, they lost to Connecticut, ending their school-record 37-game streak.

Roster

Schedule

|-
!colspan=9| Exhibition

|-
!colspan=9| Regular Season

|-
!colspan=9 | 2014 ACC women's basketball tournament

|-
!colspan=9 | 2014 NCAA Division I women's basketball tournament

Source

Rankings

See also
2013–14 Notre Dame Fighting Irish men's basketball team

References

Notre Dame Fighting Irish women's basketball seasons
Notre Dame
NCAA Division I women's basketball tournament Final Four seasons
Notre Dame
Notre Dame Fighting Irish
Notre Dame Fighting Irish